Jeffrey McLaughlin, a Democrat, served three terms in the Alabama House of Representatives until his defeat in November 2010.  He was initially elected in a special election on January 30, 2001. He was unopposed in the 2006 election.

Representative McLaughlin grew up and lives in Guntersville. He graduated from Guntersville High School as a Valedictorian in 1978. He then graduated with a B.A. from Birmingham–Southern College in 1982 and then taught high school history, government and biology for four years in Birmingham before going to law school at Harvard in 1990.

Representative McLaughlin served as a law clerk for U.S. District Judge Seybourn Lynne and also at the law firm of Maynard Cooper and Gale. Some of his most notable achievements as a legislator were the Landlord Tenant Act, several bills protecting the Tennessee River and recapturing TVA in lieu of tax dollars for the Tennessee Valley Region.  He later returned home to open up his own law office of McLaughlin, Edmondson & Hicks, LLC in 1995.

His first term as a member of the Alabama House of Representatives began from a special election in 2001. He continued to hold office until the 2010 General Election. During the 2010 General Election of Alabama, despite running unopposed by Democrats, he lost to his Republican opponent, Wes Long.

In 2011, then-Governor Robert Bentley appointed McLaughlin to serve as an Alabama delegate to the Uniform Law Commission. In that same year, he was elected to serve as a member of the Alabama Law Institute. In 2012, he was selected to be an editor of the 'Alabama Lawyer' magazine. During this time, he served as counsel for the City of Arab, AL and was appointed as Municipal Judge of the town of Grant, AL. Dubbed as "the last honest politician in Alabama" by many, others attempted to proposition him repeatedly prior to and during his time in office. On one occasion, he was given an explicit "quid pro quo" minutes before the votes were cast.^

He has maintained his practice for 14 years serving as a trial counsel, advisor to small businesses, and preparing wills and probating estates.

He and his wife Stacy have three children; Frank, William and Mary Crawford. They are involved with St. Williams Church, Lake City Civitans and the Lake Guntersville Chamber of Commerce.

He most recently gave a public interview posted on YouTube telling his story of political corruption throughout the Alabama Legislature. It sums up, in 10 minutes, how horrible the Alabama system of government is currently and how it can improve. This video was made in response, especially, to the most recent political scandal involving delegate Roy Moore.

External links 
 Photo of Jeffrey McLaughlin
Jeffrey McLaughlin - McLaughlin & Edmondson, LLC^
^http://ballotpedia.org/Jeffrey_McLaughlin 
http://www.nbcnews.com/politics/elections/roy-moore-scandal-nothing-new-alabama-politics-n825831   
https://www.youtube.com/watch?v=9YtwYmKMlc4

Members of the Alabama House of Representatives
Year of birth missing (living people)
Living people
People from Guntersville, Alabama
Harvard Law School alumni
Birmingham–Southern College alumni